See also Yummy Fur (comic) by Chester Brown..

The Yummy Fur were a Scottish indie rock band from Glasgow, formed in 1992, and disbanded 1999. The band consisted of lead singer and guitarist John McKeown and a regularly changing line-up of other musicians. McKeown has since gone on to form the band 1990s. Their name was taken from the comic book Yummy Fur by Chester Brown.

After leaving the band in 1997, Lawrence Worthington would drum for both The Male Nurse and The Fall-influenced art punk band Country Teasers.

Three future members of internationally successful Glasgow indie band Franz Ferdinand played in The Yummy Fur. Drummer Paul Thomson who joined the band in 1997, and multi-instrumentalist Alex Kapranos Huntley, who joined in 1998, were founder members of Franz Ferdinand, and Dino Bardot would join Franz Ferdinand as guitarist in 2017 to replace Nick McCarthy.

Keyboard player Mark Gibbons committed suicide in 1999.

The band were lauded by BBC Radio 1 DJ John Peel, recording two Peel Sessions in 1995 and 1998.

On 23 November 2009, it was announced that McKeown and Thomson would reunite The Yummy Fur for a brief tour of the United States in January 2010 to support a greatest hits compilation due in late January. A further report from NME confirmed the involvement of long-time Yummy Fur guitarist Brian MacDougall.

Discography

Albums
"Night Club" (Slampt LP/Guided Missile CD, 1996)
"Sexy World" (Guided Missile CD/LP, 1998)

Mini albums
"Male Shadow at Three O'Clock" (Vesuvius Records CD/10", 1998)

Compilation albums
"Kinky Cinema" (Guided Missile CD, 1997)
"Piggy Wings"  (Rock Action Records LP/CD, 2019)

Singles and EPs
 "Music By Walt Disney But Played By Yuri Gagarin Thus a Political Record" (Slampt 7", 1995)
 "Kodak Nancy Europe EP" (Guided Missile 7", 1995)
 "Plastic Cowboy" (Guided Missile 7", 1996)
 "Supermarket" (Vesuvius 7", 1996)
 "Policeman" (Guided Missile 7", 1996)
 "Stereo Girls" (Roxy 7", 1997)
 "Shoot the Ridiculant" (Guided Missile 7", 1998)

Cassettes (demo)
 "The Edith Massey Eggsplosion" (not on label, 1994) https://www.discogs.com/release/16044665-The-Yummy-Fur-The-Edith-Massey-Eggsplosion

References

External links
The Yummy Fur
Guided Missile
Vesuvius Records
1990s

Musical groups from Glasgow
Scottish indie rock groups
Musical groups established in 1992
Musical groups disestablished in 1999